The Rise of the Johnsons is a 1914 American silent comedy film featuring Oliver Hardy.

Plot

Cast
 John Edwards as Mr. Johnson
 Mattie Edwards as Mrs. Johnson
 Oliver Hardy as The Grocery Man

See also
 List of American films of 1914
 Oliver Hardy filmography

External links

1914 films
American silent short films
American black-and-white films
1914 comedy films
1914 short films
Silent American comedy films
American comedy short films
1910s American films
1910s English-language films